Gerald Mordaunt Broome Salmon, OBE (27 September 1921 – 16 April 2002) was a British businessman.

Salmon was born on 27 September 1921 in Waltham St. Lawrence, Berkshire to Lionel Mordaunt Broome Salmon and Henrietta Elizabeth Keays Young, an established military family. He followed his family tradition by joining the Indian Army. He was promoted to 2nd Lieutenant on 17 May 1941.

He joined the Peninsular and Oriental Steam Navigation Company (P&O) and became its manager. He was also director of the Wharf Company and the chairman of the board of the Hong Kong Electric Company and the Mackinnon, Mackenzie & Co.

Salmon was first appointed to the Legislative Council of Hong Kong in 1969. In 1970, he was elected chairman of the Hong Kong General Chamber of Commerce after served as a vice-chairman under M. A. R. Herries. He went on to represent the chamber from 1970 to 1972. He was also member of the Board of Trustees of United College and director of the Hong Kong Trade Development Council. In 1973, he was awarded Officer of the Order of the British Empire (OBE) for his public services in Hong Kong.

He married Margaret Anne Pike and had four sons, Hugh Gerald Broome, Peter Joseph Broome, Anthony John Broome Salmon and James Lionel Broome Salmon.

References

1921 births
2002 deaths
British expatriates in Hong Kong
Hong Kong chief executives
Members of the Executive Council of Hong Kong
Members of the Legislative Council of Hong Kong
Officers of the Order of the British Empire